Zhary is a rural locality (a village) in Petushinskoye Rural Settlement, Petushinsky District, Vladimir Oblast, Russia. The population was 5 as of 2010. There are 13 streets.

Geography 
Zhary is located 25 km north of Petushki (the district's administrative centre) by road. Kolobrodovo is the nearest rural locality.

References 

Rural localities in Petushinsky District